Sharpend Glacier is an alpine glacier, 1.5 miles (2.4 km) long, which flows into Alatna Valley from the south end of Staten Island Heights, in the Convoy Range, Victoria Land. Descriptively named from the pointed terminus of this glacier by a New Zealand Antarctic Research Program (NZARP) field party to the area, 1989–90.

Glaciers of Scott Coast